András Kozák (23 February 1943 – 24 February 2005) was a Hungarian film actor. He appeared in more than seventy films from 1962 to 2005.

Selected filmography

References

External links
 

1943 births
2005 deaths
Hungarian male film actors